In molecular biology, SNORA30 (also known as ACA30) is a non-coding RNA (ncRNA) molecule which functions in the biogenesis (modification) of other small nuclear RNAs (snRNAs). This type of modifying RNA is located in the nucleolus of eukaryotic cells. It is known as a small nucleolar RNA (snoRNA) and also often referred to as a 'guide RNA' as it 'guides' the modification process.

ACA30 was originally cloned from HeLa cells and belongs to the H/ACA box class of snoRNAs based on its structure and the proteins it is associated with.  snoRNA ACA30 is predicted to guide the pseudouridylation  of U4643 of 28S ribosomal RNA (rRNA). Pseudouridylation is the (isomerisation of the nucleoside uridine) to the different isomeric form pseudouridine(Ψ).

This snoRNA is related to other snoRNAs identified in human (ACA37) and mouse (MBI-26).

References

External links 
 
 
 

Small nuclear RNA